Deveon Everhart Aikens (born November 2, 1994) is an American professional wrestler. He is currently signed to WWE, where he performs on the NXT brand under the ring name Wes Lee, and is the current NXT North American Champion in his first reign. He is also former two-time WWE NXT Tag Team Champion. 

He is best known for his time in Impact Wrestling under the ring name Dezmond Xavier (or simply Dez). He is well known as a member of The Rascalz with Zachary Wentz, Trey Miguel, and Myron Reed. He also performed on independent promotions, mostly notably for Pro Wrestling Guerrilla (PWG), where he was one-half of the PWG World Tag Team Champions alongside Wentz and went on to become the longest reigning champions in the company’s history.

Professional wrestling career

Independent circuit (2011–2021) 

Dezmond Xavier made his wrestling debut in 2011. In 2017 at WrestleCircus he won the WC Sideshow Championship by defeating Joey Ryan.Afterwards he went to wrestle in Desastre Total Ultraviolento where he won the DTU Alto Impacto Championship.

In 2015 Dezmond Xavier teamed with Zachary Wentz while working in the independent circuit and formed a tag team by the name of Scarlet and Graves. The team competed in Combat Zone Wrestling (CZW) where he and Wentz went on to become 2-time Combat Zone Wrestling World Tag Team Champions their first time at an event called 'Cage Of Death 18' on December 10, 2016 against EYFBO and their second time at Lucha Forever Catch Me Outside against CCK Chris Brookes and Kid Lykos after losing the titles to them in year 2017. In year 2016 before he and Wentz second AAW World Tag Title reign Dezmond Xavier and Wentz at Xtreme Intense Championship Wrestling teamed together with Trey Miguel, Aaron Williams, Kyle Maverick and the all five of them together won the XICW Tag Team Championships. Also a year after that in year 2017 he and Wentz went on to wrestle at All American Wrestling where they went on to win the AAW World Tag Team Championships on July 15, 2017 at United We Stand against A. R. Fox and Rey Fenix. A  year later after that Trey Miguel and Myron Reed joined the group and then the group name changed into The Rascalz.

Also in the year 2018 Dezmond Xavier and Zachary Wentz wrestled at The Wrestling Revolver where they  won both the PWR Tag Team Championships and the One Night Tag Team Tournament of 2018. In the same year, Dezmond Xavier and Zachary Wentz also went on to Pro Wrestling Guerrilla (PWG) to win the PWG World Tag Team Championships. They would hold the titles for 1025 days, the longest reign in company history.

Impact Wrestling

X Division (2017–2018) 
In 2017 Dezmond Xavier signed with Impact Wrestling. On the April 20 episode of Impact Wrestling, Xavier made his debut in a six-way match for the X Division Championship. His first singles match in Impact took place on the July 8 episode of Xplosion, where he defeated Idris Abraham. Later that month, Xavier entered the 2017 GFW Super X Cup tournament, in which he defeated Idris Abraham in the quarterfinals, Drago in the semifinals, and Taiji Ishimori in the final to win the 2017 GFW Super X Cup. In October, Xavier made his pay-per-view debut at Bound for Glory, where he competed against Trevor Lee, Garza Jr., Matt Sydal, Petey Williams and Sonjay Dutt in a six-way match for the X Division Championship but failed to win the title. Xavier also received a singles title shot for the X Division Championship against Taiji Ishimori on the January 18, 2018 episode of Impact!, which he lost.

At Redemption, Xavier competed in a six-way X Division match, which he lost. He then lost to Brian Cage at the Under Pressure special to determine the #1 contender for the X Division Championship and he also lost to Brian Cage in a match for the X Division Championship on an episode of Impact Wrestling as well. He also has another title challenge for the X Division Championship in 2018 against Matt Sydal at the One Night Only pay-per-view event Zero Fear, in which he came up short. He then took a brief hiatus from Impact.

The Rascalz (2018–2020) 

In late 2018, Xavier was aligned with Trey Miguel and Zachary Wentz, forming a fan favorite stable under the name The Rascalz. A vignette aired promoting the debut of Rascalz on the November 15 episode of Impact!. Xavier returned to Impact, teaming with Wentz under the new stable name on the November 29 episode of Impact!, where they defeated the team of Chris Bey and Mike Sydal. After months of competing in the tag team division in the fall of 2018 and early 2019, the trio made their pay-per-view debut at Rebellion in April, and lost to Moose and The North. Around this time Xavier shortened his ring name to Dez while Trey Miguel and Zachary Wentz shortened their ring names to Trey and Wentz respectively. At Slammiversary XVII, Dez and Wentz unsuccessfully challenged The North for the World Tag Team Championship in a three-way match, also involving Latin American Exchange (Santana and Ortiz). Dez and Trey then unsuccessfully challenged North for the World Tag Team Championship on the August 2 episode of Impact!.

In October, Dez competed against Sami Callihan in a losing effort at the Impact Plus event Prelude to Glory. In December, Dez unsuccessfully challenged Ace Austin for the X Division Championship at Motown Showdown. In 2020, Dez and Wentz unsuccessfully challenged The North for the World Tag Team Championship at February's Sacrifice event. Dez and Wentz continued their success in the tag team division by defeating XXXL and the team of TJP and Fallah Bahh at the Rebellion special. On the June 2 episode of Impact!, Dez and Wentz defeated TJP and Bahh to earn a World Tag Team Championship against The North on the June 16 episode of Impact!, which they lost. On July 18, 2020, Dez and Wentz issued an open challenge to any tag team at Slammiversary. The reunited Motor City Machine Guns accepted the challenge and won the match.

On November 11, it was revealed that The Rascalz would soon be leaving Impact and had interest from both WWE and All Elite Wrestling. During the November 17 tapings, The Rascalz were given a "send-off" by the Impact locker room. Trey Miguel confirmed the following day that he, Dez and Wentz were in fact done appearing on Impact Wrestling. Dez and Wentz went on to sign with WWE while Miguel eventually returned to Impact Wrestling, effectively ending The Rascalz as a trio.

Dragon Gate (2018) 
Dragon Gate announced the debut of Xavier and his indy tag team partner Zachary Wentz at Open The New Year Gate, Dragon Gate's first show of 2018. They debuted on 13 January, where Xavier and Wentz, collectively known as Scarlet and Graves, teamed with Susumu Yokosuka in a winning effort against Genki Horiguchi, Flamita and Bandido.

Lucha Underground (2018) 
On the July 18, 2018, episode of Lucha Underground he made his debut under the name Dezmond X defeating Paul London for one of the seven ancient Aztec Medallions. The series was discontinued after season finale, Ultima Lucha Cuatro.

WWE (2020–present)

MSK (2020–2022) 
On December 2, 2020, he signed a contract with WWE and was assigned to the WWE Performance Center. On the January 13, 2021 episode of NXT, Xavier, now going by the ring name Wes Lee, and his tag team partner Zachary Wentz, now going by the ring name Nash Carter, debuted under the new team name MSK. They debuted in the Men's Dusty Rhodes Tag Team Classic tournament, which they won. At NXT TakeOver: Stand & Deliver Night One, MSK defeated the Grizzled Young Veterans (James Drake and Zack Gibson) and Legado Del Fantasma (Raul Mendoza and Joaquin Wilde) in a triple threat match for the vacant NXT Tag Team Championship. On an episode of NXT, MSK defeated Fantasma to retain their tag titles. At NXT TakeOver: In Your House, MSK teamed with NXT North American Champion Bronson Reed to defeat Legado Del Fantasma in a winner takes all match which MSK won. At The Great American Bash, MSK defeated Ciampa and Timothy Thatcher for the tag titles. Over the next two months, MSK defended their titles against Imperium and Oney Lorcan and Danny Burch.

At NXT: Halloween Havoc, Imperium defeated MSK in a Lumber Jack-o'-Lantern Tag Team match to win the titles, only for MSK to reclaim them at NXT Stand & Deliver. However, just four days later, on April 5, 2022, it was reported that WWE had released Carter due to multiple domestic abuse allegations and photos relating to Adolf Hitler and Nazi symbolism. WWE later confirmed that the NXT Tag Team Championships were officially vacated on April 8, 2022, ending Lee's second reign at six days and also leading to the end of the group MSK in WWE.

NXT North American Champion (2022–present) 
On the April 19 episode of NXT 2.0, Lee returned to television, vaguely addressing the vacating of the tag titles, before being confronted by Xyon Quinn. This led to a match between Quinn and Lee later in the evening, with Lee losing. On the May 24, 2022 episode of NXT 2.0, Lee lost against Sanga, and was taunted by Quinn before Sanga pulled him away. The following week, Lee challenged Quinn to a match and won. On the June 14, 2022 episode of NXT 2.0 Wes Lee had another highly acclaimed against Xyon Quinn that he also was successful at winning in. At NXT: The Great American Bash, Lee lost to Trick Williams after Williams rubbed an unknown substance into Lee's eyes.
 
On October 22 at NXT Halloween Havoc, Lee won the vacant NXT North American Championship in a five-man ladder match involving Carmelo Hayes, Von Wagner, Oro Mansah and Nathan Frazer. This marked Lee's first singles championship win in WWE and his second overall singles championship reign in his career. On the November 1 episode of NXT, NXT Tag Team Champions Pretty Deadly interrupted NXT Champion Bron Breakker. This led to Lee coming out, where he and Breakker challenged Pretty Deadly to a match for their tag team championship later in the show; Lee and Breakker were unsuccessful after Hayes interfered.

Personal life 
Aikens is married to Erica Marie.

Other media 
As Wes Lee, Aikens made his video game debut in WWE 2K22 as downloadable content, he is also playable in WWE 2K23 and WWE SuperCard.

Championships and accomplishments 
 All American Wrestling
 AAW Tag Team Championship (1 time) – with Zachary Wentz
 Combat Zone Wrestling
 CZW World Tag Team Championship (2 times) – with Zachary Wentz
Desastre Total Ultraviolento
DTU Alto Impacto Championship (1 time)
 Impact Wrestling
 Super X Cup (2017)
 Gravy Train Turkey Trot (2018) – with Alisha Edwards, Kikutaro, KM, and Fallah Bahh
 Pro Wrestling Guerrilla
 PWG World Tag Team Championship (1 time) – with Zachary Wentz
Pro Wrestling Illustrated
 Ranked No. 332 of the top 500 singles wrestlers in the PWI 500 in 2021
 WrestleCircus
 WC Sideshow Championship (1 time)
The Wrestling Revolver
PWR Tag Team Championship (1 time) – with Zachary Wentz
One Night Tag Team Tournament (2018) – with Zachary Wentz
 WWE
NXT North American Championship (1 time, current)
NXT Tag Team Championship (2 times) – with Nash Carter
 Men's Dusty Rhodes Tag Team Classic (2021) – with Nash Carter
 Xtreme Intense Championship Wrestling
 XICW Tag Team Championship (1 time) – with Aaron Williams, Dave Crist, Kyle Maverick, Trey Miguel, and Zachary Wentz

References

External links 

 
 
 
 
 Impact Wrestling Profile

Living people
American male professional wrestlers
African-American male professional wrestlers
Professional wrestlers from Ohio
Sportspeople from Dayton, Ohio
1988 births
NXT North American Champions
NXT Tag Team Champions
21st-century African-American sportspeople
21st-century professional wrestlers
PWG World Tag Team Champions
AAW Tag Team Champions